Biomedicine & Pharmacotherapy is a peer-reviewed medical journal covering medical applications of pharmacology. It was established in 1956 and is published ten times a year by Elsevier, which has been publishing the journal since 1988. The editor-in-chief is D.M. Townsend (Medical University of South Carolina). According to the Journal Citation Reports, the journal has a 2020 impact factor of 6.529.

References

External links

Elsevier academic journals
Publications established in 1956
Pharmacotherapy journals
English-language journals
French-language journals